The Sui dynasty was a short-lived imperial dynasty of China that lasted from 581 to 618. The Sui unified the Northern and Southern dynasties, thus ending the long period of division following the fall of the Western Jin dynasty, and laying the foundations for the much longer lasting Tang dynasty. 

The dynasty was founded by Yang Jian (Emperor Wen of Sui), a member of the ethnically-mixed northwestern Chinese military aristocracy which had developed during the previous period of division. The Sui dynasty capital was Chang'an (which was renamed Daxing, modern Xi'an, Shaanxi) from 581 to 605 and later Luoyang (605–18). Emperors Wen and his successor Yang undertook various centralized reforms, most notably the equal-field system, intended to reduce economic inequality and improve agricultural productivity; the institution of the Five Departments and Six Board (五省六曹 or 五省六部) system, which is a predecessor of Three Departments and Six Ministries system; and the standardization and re-unification of the coinage. They also spread and encouraged Buddhism throughout the empire. By the middle of the dynasty, the newly unified empire entered a golden age of prosperity with vast agricultural surplus that supported rapid population growth.

A lasting legacy of the Sui dynasty was the Grand Canal. With the eastern capital Luoyang at the center of the network, it linked the west-lying capital Chang'an to the economic and agricultural centers of the east towards Jiangdu (now Yangzhou, Jiangsu) and Yuhang (now Hangzhou, Zhejiang), and to the northern border near modern Beijing. While the pressing initial motives were for shipment of grains to the capital, transporting troops, and military logistics, the reliable inland shipment links would facilitate domestic trade, flow of people and cultural exchange for centuries. Along with the extension of the Great Wall, and the construction of the eastern capital city of Luoyang, these mega projects, led by an efficient centralized bureaucracy, would amass millions of conscripted workers from the large population base, at heavy cost of human lives.

After a series of costly and disastrous military campaigns against Goguryeo, one of the Three Kingdoms of Korea, ended in defeat by 614, the dynasty disintegrated under a series of popular revolts culminating in the assassination of Emperor Yang by his minister, Yuwen Huaji in 618. The dynasty, which lasted only thirty-seven years, was undermined by ambitious wars and construction projects, which overstretched its resources. Particularly, under Emperor Yang, heavy taxation and compulsory labor duties would eventually induce widespread revolts and brief civil war following the fall of the dynasty.

The dynasty is often compared to the earlier Qin dynasty for unifying China after prolonged division. Wide-ranging reforms and construction projects were undertaken to consolidate the newly unified state, with long-lasting influences beyond their short dynastic reigns.

History

Emperor Wen and the founding of Sui
Towards the late Northern and Southern dynasties, the Xianbei-ruled Northern Zhou conquered the Northern Qi in 577 and reunified northern China. By this time, Yang Jian, a Northern Zhou general who would later found the Sui dynasty, became the regent to the Northern Zhou court. Yang Jian's clan, the Yang clan of Hongnong, had Han origins and claimed descent from the Han dynasty general Yang Zhen, but had intermarried with the Xianbei for generations. Yang Jian's daughter was the Empress Dowager, and her stepson, Emperor Jing of Northern Zhou, was a child. After crushing an army in the eastern provinces, Yang Jian usurped the throne from the Northern Zhou rulers, and became Emperor Wen of Sui. While formerly the Duke of Sui when serving at the Zhou court, where the character "Sui " literally means "to follow" and implies loyalty, Emperor Wen created the unique character "Sui", morphed from the character of his former title, as the name of his newly founded dynasty. In a bloody purge, he had fifty-nine princes of the Zhou royal family eliminated, yet nevertheless became known as the "Cultured Emperor". Emperor Wen abolished the anti-Han policies of Northern Zhou and reclaimed his Han surname of Yang. Having won the support of Confucian scholars who held power in previous Han dynasties (abandoning the nepotism and corruption of the nine-rank system), Emperor Wen initiated a series of reforms aimed at strengthening his empire for the wars that would reunify China.

In his campaign for southern conquest, Emperor Wen assembled thousands of boats to confront the naval forces of the Chen dynasty on the Yangtze River. The largest of these ships were very tall, having five layered decks and the capacity for 800 non-crew personnel. They were outfitted with six 50-foot-long booms that were used to swing and damage enemy ships, or to pin them down so that Sui marine troops could use act-and-board techniques. Besides employing Xianbei and other Chinese ethnic groups for the fight against Chen, Emperor Wen also employed the service of people from southeastern Sichuan, which Sui had recently conquered.

In 588, the Sui had amassed 518,000 troops along the northern bank of the Yangtze River, stretching from Sichuan to the East China Sea. The Chen dynasty could not withstand such an assault. By 589, Sui troops entered Jiankang (Nanjing) and the last emperor of Chen surrendered. The city was razed to the ground, while Sui troops escorted Chen nobles back north, where the northern aristocrats became fascinated with everything the south had to provide culturally and intellectually.

Although Emperor Wen was famous for bankrupting the state treasury with warfare and construction projects, he made many improvements to infrastructure during his early reign. He established granaries as sources of food and as a means to regulate market prices from the taxation of crops, much like the earlier Han dynasty. The large agricultural surplus supported rapid growth of population to a historical peak, which was only surpassed at the zenith of the Tang dynasty more than a century later.

The state capital of Chang'an (Daxing), while situated in the militarily secure heartland of Guanzhong, was remote from the economic centers to the east and south of the empire. Emperor Wen initiated the construction of the Grand Canal, with completion of the first (and the shortest) route that directly linked Chang'an to the Yellow River (Huang He). Later, Emperor Yang enormously enlarged the scale of the Grand Canal construction.

Externally, the emerging nomadic Turkic (Tujue) Khaganate in the north posed a major threat to the newly founded dynasty. With Emperor Wen's diplomatic maneuver, the Khaganate split into Eastern and Western halves. Later the Great Wall was consolidated to further secure the northern territory. In Emperor Wen's late years, the first war with Goguryeo (Korea), ended with defeat. Nevertheless, the celebrated "Reign of Kaihuang" (era name of Emperor Wen) was considered by historians as one of the apexes in the two millennium imperial period of Chinese history.

The Sui Emperors were from the northwest military aristocracy, and they cited as their ancestors the Yang of Hongnong 弘農楊氏, a Han clan. They emphasized their Han ancestry, and claimed descent from the Han official Yang Zhen. The New Book of Tang traces their patrilineal ancestry to the Zhou dynasty kings via the Dukes of Jin. The Li of Zhaojun and the Lu of Fanyang hailed from Shandong and were related to the Liu clan, which was also linked to the Yang of Hongnong and other clans of Guanlong.

The Yang of Hongnong, Jia of Hedong, Xiang of Henei, and Wang of Taiyuan from the Tang dynasty were later claimed as ancestors by Song dynasty lineages.]]
Information about these major political events in China were somehow filtered west and reached the Byzantine Empire, the continuation of the Roman Empire in the east. From Turkic peoples of Central Asia the Eastern Romans derived a new name for China after the older Sinae and Serica: Taugast (Old Turkic: Tabghach), during its Northern Wei (386–535) period. The 7th-century Byzantine historian Theophylact Simocatta wrote a generally accurate depiction of the reunification of China by Emperor Wen of the Sui dynasty, with the conquest of the rival Chen dynasty in southern China. Simocatta correctly placed these events within the reign period of Byzantine ruler Maurice. Simocatta also provided cursory information about the geography of China, its division by the Yangzi River and its capital Khubdan (from Old Turkic Khumdan, i.e. Chang'an) along with its customs and culture, deeming its people "idolatrous" but wise in governance. He noted that the ruler was named "Taisson", which he claimed meant "Son of God", perhaps Chinese Tianzi (Son of Heaven) or even the name of the contemporary ruler Emperor Taizong of Tang.

Emperor Yang and the reconquest of Vietnam

Emperor Yang of Sui (569–618) ascended the throne after his father's death, possibly by murder. He further extended the empire, but unlike his father, did not seek to gain support from the nomads. Instead, he restored Confucian education and the Confucian examination system for bureaucrats. By supporting educational reforms, he lost the support of the nomads. He also started many expensive construction projects such as the Grand Canal of China, and became embroiled in several costly wars. Between these policies, invasions into China from Turkic nomads, and his growing life of decadent luxury at the expense of the peasantry, he lost public support and was eventually assassinated by his own ministers.

Both Emperors Yang and Wen sent military expeditions into Vietnam as Annam in northern Vietnam had been incorporated into the Chinese empire over 600 years earlier during the Han dynasty (202 BC – 220 AD). However the Kingdom of Champa in central Vietnam became a major counterpart to Chinese invasions to its north. According to Ebrey, Walthall, and Palais, these invasions became known as the Linyi-Champa Campaign (602–605).

The Hanoi area formerly held by the Han and Jin dynasties was easily retaken from the Early Lý dynasty ruler Lý Phật Tử in 602. A few years later the Sui army pushed farther south and was attacked by troops on war elephants from Champa in southern Vietnam. The Sui army feigned retreat and dug pits to trap the elephants, lured the Champan troops to attack then used crossbows against the elephants causing them to turn around and trample their own soldiers. Although Sui troops were victorious many succumbed to disease as northern soldiers did not have immunity to tropical diseases such as malaria.

Goguryeo-Sui wars

The Sui dynasty led a series of massive expeditions to invade Goguryeo, one of the Three Kingdoms of Korea. Emperor Yang conscripted many soldiers for the campaign. This army was so enormous it recorded in historical texts that it took 30 days for all the armies to exit their last rallying point near Shanhaiguan before invading Goguryeo. In one instance the soldiers—both conscripted and paid—listed over 3000 warships, up to 1.15 million infantry, 50,000 cavalry, 5000 artillery, and more. Each of the four military expeditions ended in failure, incurring a substantial financial and manpower deficit from which the Sui would never recover.

Fall of the Sui dynasty

One of the major work projects undertaken by the Sui was construction activities along the Great Wall of China; but this, along with other large projects, strained the economy and angered the resentful workforce employed. During the last few years of the Sui dynasty, the rebellion that rose against it took many of China's able-bodied men from rural farms and other occupations, which in turn damaged the agricultural base and the economy further. Men would deliberately break their limbs in order to avoid military conscription, calling the practice "propitious paws" and "fortunate feet." Later, after the fall of Sui, in the year 642, Emperor Taizong of Tang made an effort to eradicate this practice by issuing a decree of a stiffer punishment for those who were found to deliberately injure and heal themselves.

Although the Sui dynasty was relatively short (581–618), much was accomplished during its tenure. The Grand Canal was one of the main accomplishments. It was extended north from the Hangzhou region across the Yangzi to Yangzhou and then northwest to the region of Luoyang. Again, like the Great Wall works, the massive conscription of labor and allocation of resources for the Grand Canal project resulted in challenges for Sui dynastic continuity. The eventual fall of the Sui dynasty was also due to the many losses caused by the failed military campaigns against Goguryeo. It was after these defeats and losses that the country was left in ruins and rebels soon took control of the government. Emperor Yang was assassinated in 618. He had gone South after the capital being threatened by various rebel groups and was killed by his advisors (Yuwen Clan). Meanwhile, in the North, the aristocrat Li Yuan held an uprising after which he ended up ascending the throne to become Emperor Gaozu of Tang. This was the start of the Tang dynasty, one of the most-noted dynasties in Chinese history.

There were Dukedoms for the offspring of the royal families of the Zhou dynasty, Sui dynasty, and Tang dynasty in the Later Jin (Five Dynasties).

Culture

Although the Sui dynasty was relatively short-lived, in terms of culture, it represents a transition from the preceding ages, and many cultural developments which can be seen to be incipient during the Sui dynasty later were expanded and consolidated during the ensuing Tang dynasty, and later ages. This includes not only the major public works initiated, such as the Great Wall and the Great Canal, but also the political system developed by Sui, which was adopted by Tang with little initial change other than at the top of the political hierarchy. Other cultural developments of the Sui dynasty included religion and literature, particular examples being Buddhism and poetry.

Rituals and sacrifices were conducted by the Sui.

Taoism
The Sui court pursued a pro-Taoist policy. The first reign of the dynasty saw the state promoting the Northern Louguan school of Taoism, while the second reign instead promoted the Southern Shangqing school of Taoism, possibly due to Emperor Yang's preference for Southern culture.

Buddhism

Buddhism was popular during the Sixteen Kingdoms and Northern and Southern dynasties period that preceded the Sui dynasty, spreading from India through Kushan Afghanistan into China during the Late Han period. Buddhism gained prominence during the period when central political control was limited. Buddhism created a unifying cultural force that uplifted the people out of war and into the Sui dynasty. In many ways, Buddhism was responsible for the rebirth of culture in China under the Sui dynasty.

While early Buddhist teachings were acquired from Sanskrit sutras from India, it was during the late Six dynasties and Sui dynasty that local Chinese schools of Buddhist thoughts started to flourish. Most notably, Zhiyi founded the Tiantai school and completed the Great treatise on Concentration and Insight, within which he taught the principle of "Three Thousand Realms in a Single moment of Life" as the essence of Buddhist teaching outlined in the Lotus Sutra.

Emperor Wen and his empress had converted to Buddhism to legitimize imperial authority over China and the conquest of Chen. The emperor presented himself as a Cakravartin king, a Buddhist monarch who would use military force to defend the Buddhist faith. In the year 601 AD, Emperor Wen had relics of the Buddha distributed to temples throughout China, with edicts that expressed his goals, "all the people within the Four Seas may, without exception, develop enlightenment and together cultivate fortunate karma, bringing it to pass that present existences will lead to happy future lives, that the sustained creation of good causation will carry us one and all up to wondrous enlightenment". Ultimately, this act was an imitation of the ancient Mauryan Emperor Ashoka of India.

Confucianism
Confucian philosopher Wang Tong wrote and taught during the Sui dynasty, and even briefly held office as Secretary of Shuzhou. His most famous (as well as only surviving) work, the Explanation of the Mean (Zhongshuo, 中說) was compiled shortly after his death in 617.

Poetry 

Although poetry continued to be written, and certain poets rose in prominence while others disappeared from the landscape, the brief Sui dynasty, in terms of the development of Chinese poetry, lacks distinction, though it nonetheless represents a continuity between the Six Dynasties and the poetry of Tang. Sui dynasty poets include Yang Guang (580–618), who was the last Sui emperor (and a sort of poetry critic); and also, the Lady Hou, one of his consorts.

Rulers

Family tree of the Sui emperors

See also 

 Chinese sovereign
 Extreme weather events of 535–536
 Grand Canal of China
 History of China
 List of tributaries of Imperial China
 Anji Bridge

Notes

References

External links 

 Classical Imperial China

 
Dynasties in Chinese history
Former countries in Chinese history
Medieval Asia
6th century in China
7th century in China
.
States and territories established in the 580s
States and territories disestablished in the 7th century
581 establishments
6th-century establishments in China
618 disestablishments
7th-century disestablishments in China
6th-century establishments in Vietnam
7th-century disestablishments in Vietnam